The 2016–17 Drake Bulldogs men's basketball team represented Drake University during the 2016–17 NCAA Division I men's basketball season. The Bulldogs were led by interim head coach Jeff Rutter. They played their home games at the Knapp Center in Des Moines, Iowa and were members of the Missouri Valley Conference.

Fourth-year head coach Ray Giacoletti resigned on December 6, 2016 after the first eight games of the season. Assistant coach Jeff Rutter was named interim head coach.

They finished the season 7–24, 5–13 to finish in a tie for ninth place in MVC play. They lost in the first round of the Missouri Valley Conference tournament to Bradley.

Following the season, the school chose not to keep Jeff Rutter as head coach and hired Niko Medved, former head coach at Furman, as the Bulldogs' new head coach.

Previous season 
The Bulldogs finished the season 7–24, 2–16 in Missouri Valley play to finish in last place. They lost in the first round of the Missouri Valley tournament to Missouri State.

Preseason 
Drake was picked to finish last in the preseason MVC poll.

Departures

Incoming Transfers

Incoming recruits 
Drake did not have any incoming players in the 2016 recruiting class.

Recruiting class of 2017

Roster

Schedule and results

|-
!colspan=9 style=| Exhibition

|-
!colspan=9 style=| Non-conference regular season

|-
!colspan=9 style=| Missouri Valley Conference regular season

|-
!colspan=9 style=| Missouri Valley tournament

References

Drake Bulldogs men's basketball seasons
Drake
Drake
Drake